The 1964 Northwestern Wildcats team represented Northwestern University during the 1964 Big Ten Conference football season. In their first year under head coach Alex Agase, the Wildcats compiled a 3–6 record (2–5 against Big Ten Conference opponents) and finished in a tie for seventh place in the Big Ten Conference.

The team's offensive leaders were quarterback Tom Myers with 901 passing yards, Steve Murphy with 377 rushing yards, and Cas Banaszek with 317 receiving yards. Center Joe Cerne was selected as a first-team All-Big Ten player, and as a second-team All-American by the Newspaper Enterprise Association.

Schedule

References

Northwestern
Northwestern Wildcats football seasons
Northwestern Wildcats football